The UNESCO World Heritage Site Historic Monuments of Ancient Kyoto (Kyoto, Uji and Otsu Cities) encompasses 17 locations in Japan within the city of Kyoto and its immediate vicinity. In 794, the Japanese imperial family moved the capital to Heian-kyō. The locations are in three cities: Kyoto and Uji in Kyoto Prefecture; and Ōtsu in Shiga Prefecture; Uji and Ōtsu border Kyoto to the south and north, respectively. Of the monuments, 13 are Buddhist temples, three are Shinto shrines, and one is a castle. The properties include 38 buildings designated by the Japanese government as National Treasures, 160 properties designated as Important Cultural Properties, eight gardens designated as Special Places of Scenic Beauty, and four designated as Places of Scenic Beauty. UNESCO listed the site as World Heritage in 1994.

Selection criteria
Kyoto has a substantial number of historic buildings, unlike other Japanese cities that lost buildings to foreign invasions and war; and has the largest concentration of designated Cultural Properties in Japan. Although ravaged by wars, fires, and earthquakes during its eleven centuries as the imperial capital, Kyoto was spared from much of the destruction and danger of World War II. It was saved from the nearly universal firebombing of large cities in Japan in part to preserve it as the primary atomic bomb target. It was later removed from the atomic bomb target list by the personal intervention of Secretary of War Henry L. Stimson, as Stimson wanted to save this cultural center which he knew from his honeymoon and later diplomatic visits. As a result, Nagasaki was then added as a target.

The 17 properties of the World Heritage Site originate from a period between the 10th century and the 19th century, and each is representative of the period in which it was built. The historical importance of the Kyoto region was taken into account by the UNESCO in the selection process.

List of sites
The table lists information about each of the 17 listed properties of the World Heritage Site listing:
Name: in English and Japanese
Type: Purpose of the site. The list includes 13 Buddhist temples ("-ji"), 3 Shinto shrines ("-jinja"), and one castle ("-jo").
Period: time period of significance, typically of construction
Location: the site's location (by ward) and by geographic coordinates
Description: brief description of the site

See also 
 List of World Heritage Sites in Japan
 Tourism in Japan

References

External links 

 Historic Monuments of Ancient Kyoto (Kyoto, Uji and Otsu Cities) - UNESCO World Heritage Centre
 World Heritage Historic Monuments of Ancient Kyoto
 Welcome to Kyoto - World Heritage Map

World Heritage Sites in Japan
Buildings and structures in Kyoto Prefecture
Kyoto
Tourist attractions in Kyoto Prefecture